Lewis Beaumont  (1847–1922) was a Royal Navy officer.

Lewis or Louis Beaumont may also refer to:
Sir Lewis Beaumont, 5th Baronet ( 1673–1738) of the Beaumont baronets
Lewis de Beaumont (died 1333), Bishop of Durham
Louis-Marie-Joseph Beaumont (1753–1828), Canadian farmer and political figure

See also
Beaumont (surname)